Lola Bunny is a Looney Tunes cartoon character portrayed as an anthropomorphic female rabbit created by Warner Bros. Pictures. She is generally depicted as Bugs Bunny's girlfriend. She first appeared in the 1996 film Space Jam.

Development

Honey Bunny 
The first character with the name "Honey Bunny" first appeared in the Bugs Bunny's Album comic book in 1953. That character was depicted as Bugs' cousin who is an explorer. The name was reused for a separate character intended as Bugs' love interest, who debuted in Bugs Bunny Comic Book #108 on November 15, 1966. Robert McKimson designed the prototype version of the character with Phil DeLara redesigning Honey and using her as a semi-regular in the Looney Tunes Gold Key Comics in the 1960s.

Honey's physical appearance varied over time. She was originally drawn with lop ears with a bow and pale yellow-tan fur. A female rabbit resembling this design appears at the end of the 1979 television special Bugs Bunny's Thanksgiving Diet. Later merchandise using the character depicted her as more closely resembling Bugs, with grey fur but a more visibly feminine model and clothing, which was used until the early 1990s. She also made several video game cameos such as The Bugs Bunny Crazy Castle, Bugs Bunny's Birthday Ball, and The Bugs Bunny Crazy Castle 2. Honey was also mentioned in the book Looney Tunes: The Official Visual Guide.

In the mid-1990s, Warner Bros. started working on Space Jam (1996). There were plans to feature Honey Bunny. Some artists commented that Honey looked too much like Bugs, and eventually created Lola Bunny as a replacement.

History

Space Jam  
Lola first appeared in the 1996 film Space Jam. She is shown with tan fur, blonde bangs, and wears a cropped yellow tank top, purple shorts and a matching rubber band on both ears like a ponytail. She has light blue eyes and a shapely figure. Lola is voiced by Kath E. Soucie in the film.

Lola was created to serve as a romantic interest for Bugs. As soon as she appears, Bugs is instantly smitten and several other male characters ogle her. Throughout the film, there is a sub-plot of Bugs attempting to win her affection. Lola reciprocates Bugs' feelings when she is nearly injured by one of the opponents in the basketball game, and Bugs saves her.

According to author Kevin Sandler, Lola's personality is a combination of the Hawksian woman, tomboy, and femme fatale archetypes. She is a straight-talking, no-nonsense woman who is extremely independent and confident. She is both highly athletic and extremely seductive in her behavior. Her catchphrase is "Don't ever call me 'Doll'". As animation director Tony Cervone explained, Lola was originally intended to be more of a "tomboy", but the production team feared that she would appear "too masculine" and chose to emphasize her "feminine attributes" instead.

Following Space Jam, Lola has regularly appeared in solo stories in the monthly Looney Tunes comic published by DC Comics.

Other appearances
Lola appears as a news reporter twice, both in the direct-to-video film Tweety's High-Flying Adventure and the game Looney Tunes: Space Race. Kath Soucie reprises her voice in both. In the series Baby Looney Tunes, she is like her older counterpart in Space Jam, having tomboyish traits and an affinity for basketball. She is voiced by Britt McKillip. In the action-comedy Loonatics Unleashed, her descendant is Lexi Bunny.

The Looney Tunes Show
Lola also appears in The Looney Tunes Show, where she was voiced by Kristen Wiig. As opposed to her personality in Space Jam, she is portrayed as an eccentric, airheaded, endearing, and cheerful young rabbit who tends to obsess over Bugs, whom she refers to as "Bun-Bun". She is very dedicated to achieving goals, but oftentimes tends to forget what she was doing. Lola is mostly involved in bizarre situations, either created by herself or when accompanied by her friend Daffy.

Bugs nevertheless appears to enjoy having her around, even surprising himself when declaring himself her boyfriend in "Double Date" where she helped Daffy get the courage to ask Tina Russo out on a date. Later in the series, Bugs and Lola are seen in multiple episodes spending time with each other.

Lola's wealthy parents Walter (voiced by John O'Hurley) and Patricia (voiced by Grey DeLisle in season 1, Wendi McLendon-Covey in season 2) appear in the show as well.

Lola is the titular lead character in the straight-to-video spin-off film Looney Tunes: Rabbits Run. In this film, however, here she is voiced by Rachel Ramras but still retains her Looney Tunes Show personality.

Later appearances
The New Looney Tunes portrays Lola as a happy and friendly character but with a more serious personality almost like her original character from her debut. She appears in the segments "Hare to the Throne", "Lola Rider" and "Rhoda Derby". Her appearance is similar to The Looney Tunes Show, although she wears a different outfit. She always shows eccentricity and maintains her carefree attitude. Her intrepid and adventurous side appears within some episodes, where she performs various sports. Lola returned in Space Jam: A New Legacy with an updated character design, voiced by Zendaya although Soucie was initially announced to be reprising the role.

Lola appeared in the preschool series Bugs Bunny Builders, this time being voiced by Chandni Parekh, once again having a different voice. This version gained positive reception for her personality and her defying gender stereotypes by working as a leader for a construction team.

Voice actresses 
Since Lola Bunny's first official appearance in 1996, the cartoon character has been voiced by a variety of voice actresses.

For the majority of the Looney Tunes series, Lola's character was voiced by Kath Soucie, an American voice actress. Soucie has voiced Lola in Space Jam (1996), Tweety's High-Flying Adventure (2000), Looney Tunes Racing (2000), Looney Tunes: Space Race (2000), the Looney Tunes webtoons (2001–2005), Looney Tunes Dance Off (2010) and New Looney Tunes (2015–2020).

From 2011 to 2014, American actress, comedian, writer, and producer Kristen Wiig, voiced Lola in The Looney Tunes Show. For her portrayal, Wiig received several nominations and won the People's Choice Voice Acting Award in 2011.

Others
Britt McKillip (Baby Looney Tunes, Baby Looney Tunes' Eggs-traordinary Adventure)
Jessica DiCicco (as Lexi (descendant of character) in Loonatics Unleashed)
Rachel Ramras (Scooby Doo & Looney Tunes Cartoon Universe: Adventure, Looney Tunes: Rabbits Run)
 Carla Delaney (Daffy Duck Dance Off)
 Zendaya (Space Jam: A New Legacy)
 Chandni Parekh (Bugs Bunny Builders)

Reception and legacy
Since her first appearance, Lola quickly became a fan favorite and an iconic character in the Looney Tunes franchise. She has frequently been regarded as an animated sex symbol. In 2020, she was named the "most attractive cartoon character across the world" based on global search volume per month. Shannon Carlin of Bustle.com praised Lola from Space Jam, calling her "confident" and "talented". Dan Kahan of PopDust.com wrote that Lola was meant to be "ogled, both by in-world characters and viewers".

Lola from The Looney Tunes Show was well received by critics. CBR.com ranked Lola and Bugs No. 2 in their 10 Best Romances From Childhood Cartoons, stating that she is more "lively and vapid" than in Space Jam, and is "pretty cute and funny to watch". IGN.com praised the character, calling her a "crazy but charming character" with Kristen Wiig doing "a phenomenal job". WhatCulture.com calls Lola more interesting compared to her first appearance, stating that the "Lola of this show is scatter-brained, strange, and incredibly off-putting, making her leagues more interesting and funny as a result." Jonathan North of Rotoscopers.com complimented Lola from the same series, saying that it "brought out Lola's character far better than her debut in Space Jam did."

In 2019, after watching the original Space Jam for the first time, Malcolm D. Lee, the director for Space Jam: A New Legacy, said that he "felt off-guard on how Lola was too sexualized" and decided to turn her into the typical "strong woman" character of modern films, stating: "The original Lola Bunny was not politically correct...It's important to reflect the authenticity of strong, capable female characters." The new personality and look gained controversy, specifically among Twitter, as fans complained about her "nerfed" appearance that made her intentionally less physically appealing.

Author Kevin Sandler has said that Lola Bunny was created as a female merchandising counterpart to Bugs Bunny. The character's original merchandise now sells for far more than its original price on resale markets. For example, original dolls now sell for hundreds of dollars on eBay. However, Lola Bunny is not the only character to see a rise in contemporary popularity, as original Looney Tunes merchandise in general has gained nostalgic value.

Accolades 
Kristen Wiig, who portrayed Lola Bunny in The Looney Tunes Show, received several nominations for her work and won the 1 Behind the Voice Actors Award.

References

Anthropomorphic rabbits and hares
Fictional rabbits and hares
Fictional basketball players
Looney Tunes characters
Female characters in animated films
Film characters introduced in 1996
Animated characters introduced in 1996
Female characters in animation
Female characters in film
Space Jam